The Yaquina Head Light, also known early in its existence as the Cape Foulweather Lighthouse, is a lighthouse on the Oregon Coast of the United States, established in 1873. It is located in Lincoln County, near the mouth of the Yaquina River near Newport at Yaquina Head.

History
Made in Paris in 1868 and shipped to Oregon, Yaquina Head Light was first lit August 20, 1873, and automated in 1966. It is active with an identifying light characteristic of two seconds on, two seconds off, two seconds on, and 14 seconds off.

A two-story keepers' dwelling was built at the time the lighthouse tower and its adjoining oil house were constructed. In 1923, a one-story keepers' house was added a short distance to the east. In 1938, a one-story building replaced the original two-story dwelling. Both dwellings and all outbuildings (a shed, a garage, etc.) were then demolished in 1984. The space is now a grassy area.

Yaquina Head typically had three lighthouse keepers under the U.S. Lighthouse Service; a Head Keeper, and First and Second Assistant. The Head Keeper as well as the First Assistant usually stayed in the two-story keepers' dwelling with their families and the Second Assistant was usually a bachelor. In 1939 the U.S. Coast Guard took over the management. During World War II, 17 servicemen were stationed at Yaquina Head to keep a lookout for enemy ships.

The lighthouse still uses its original 1868 French-made, 1st order, Fixed Fresnel lens, visible  out to sea. In 1993, the lighthouse was listed in the National Register of Historic Places (reference number #73002340).

Film and television location
The lighthouse was used as the setting for the "Moesko Island Lighthouse" in the 2002 film The Ring. It had already appeared in an earlier film, Hysterical (1983), and The Nancy Drew Mysteries 1977 television series episode "The Mystery of Pirate's Cove".

Yaquina Head Interpretive Center
The  site was established by Congress as an Outstanding Natural Area in 1980.  The Bureau of Land Management manages the Yaquina Head Outstanding Natural Area, including the lighthouse. The Yaquina Head Interpretive Center opened in 1997 and includes exhibits about the history and preservation of the lighthouse, and the marine life found in tide pools and along the coast.  The Center includes a gift shop.

The lighthouse lantern is operated by the U.S. Coast Guard and the U.S. Fish and Wildlife Service monitors offshore bird rookeries and wildlife.  The Oregon Department of Fish and Wildlife manages the intertidal animals, and the Oregon Department of State Lands is responsible for the intertidal lands.

Lighthouse tours are available. Space on these tours is limited and available on a first-come, first-served basis at the Interpretive Center desk.

See also
 List of lighthouses on the Oregon Coast

References

External links

Yaquina Head BLM Site
Friends of Yaquina Lighthouses - Yaquina Head Light - museum and tour information

Lighthouses completed in 1873
Newport, Oregon
Oregon Coast
Lighthouses on the National Register of Historic Places in Oregon
Lighthouse museums in Oregon
Museums in Lincoln County, Oregon
Transportation buildings and structures in Lincoln County, Oregon
National Register of Historic Places in Lincoln County, Oregon